Trachischium tenuiceps, also known as the yellowbelly worm-eating snake, is a species of colubrid snake found in South Asia and Tibet.

Geographic range
It is found in Nepal, Bangladesh, northeast India (Darjeeling, Sikkim, Arunachal Pradesh [Mokto, Bomdir – Tawang district] ) and Tibet and possibly also in Bhutan.

Description
Trachischium tenuiceps is blackish dorsally, and, as the common name implies, it is yellowish ventrally. The smooth dorsal scales are arranged in 13 rows, with males having keeled dorsal scales in the anal region. Ventrals 134–138; anal divided; subcaudals 34–39. Adults may attain 35 cm (14 inches) in total length, and have a tail 5 cm (2 inches) long.

References

 Blyth, Edward. 1855 Notices and descriptions of various reptiles, new or little known [part 2]. Jour. Asiatic Soc. Bengal, Calcutta, 23 (3): 287–302 [1854]

Trachischium
Reptiles of Bangladesh
Snakes of China
Reptiles of India
Reptiles of Nepal
Fauna of Tibet
Reptiles described in 1854
Taxa named by Edward Blyth